Ollastra is a comune (municipality) in the Province of Oristano in the Italian region Sardinia, located about  northwest of Cagliari and about  northeast of Oristano.

Ollastra Simaxis borders the following municipalities: Fordongianus, Siapiccia, Simaxis, Villanova Truschedu, Zerfaliu.

From 1928 to 1946 the place was a frazione of nearby Simaxis and was therefore known as Ollastra Simaxis. It changed its name to simply Ollastra in 1991.

References

Cities and towns in Sardinia